The Maltese Premier League 2008–09 was the 94th season of the Maltese Premier League, the top-tier Association Football competition in Malta. It began on 23 August 2008 with a scoreless draw between Floriana and Hamrun Spartans; and ended on 24 May 2009. The first goal in the season was scored by Ivan, who played for Qormi. Hibernians were crowned champions on 23 May 2009, surpassing rivals Valletta by two points and winning their tenth title.

Changes from 2007–08
 Promoted: Qormi, Tarxien
 Relegated: Mqabba, Pieta Hotspurs

Competition modus
In the First phase, every team played each opponent twice, once home and once away, for a total of 18 games. The league was then split in two pools. Earned points were halved.  Teams that finished in positions 1–6 compete in the "Top Six" and teams finishing in positions 7–10 play in the "Play-Out".

First phase

League table

Results

Second phase

Top Six

Play-Out

Deciding game
Because Tarxien Rainbows, Msida Saint-Joseph and Hamrun Spartans were tied on points after all matches played, their head-to head results in Play-Out were decisive. Hamrun Spartans had the fewest points in those matches and were therefore immediately relegated. However, Tarxien Rainbows and Msida Saint-Joseph were equal on points in their two matches and they played a decision game to determine the second relegated team. The match was played on 8 May 2009 at Hibernians Ground. However, in the wake of a corruption scandal, both Hamrun Spartans and Msida Saint-Joseph were returned to the Premier League.

Top goalscorers

References

External links
 Premier League official page
 UEFA website

Maltese Premier League seasons
Mal
1